Backburn is a rural settlement near Gartly in Aberdeenshire, Scotland.

References

Villages in Aberdeenshire